Samuel or Sam Woods may refer to:
Sam Woods (politician) (1846–1915), British trade unionist
Samuel D. Woods (1845–1915), U.S. Representative from California
Samuel V. Woods (1856–?), member of the West Virginia Senate
Sammy Woods (1867–1931), Australian cricketer
Samuel Kofi Woods (born 1964), Liberian activist
Samuel Woods (footballer) (1871–?), Scottish footballer
Sam Woods (baseball) (1920–1983), American Negro leagues baseball player
Sam Woods (civil servant), British civil servant
Samuel Woods (priest), priest in New Zealand
Sam Woods (footballer) (born 1998), English footballer for Plymouth Argyle F.C.

See also
Samuel Wood (disambiguation)